Amirizdwan Taj Bin Tajuddin (born 30 March 1986), commonly known as Taj, is a Malaysian professional footballer who plays as a centre back and capped by Malaysian national team.

Born in Kota Bharu, Kelantan, Taj never seriously play football at his youth where he attended MRSM Gerik and later MRSM Kuala Terengganu. His football career began while completing his undergraduate studies at Universiti Teknologi MARA where he played for UiTM FC. During that time, Taj was commonly known by nickname Panjang which means tall in English, to describe his tall physic body compared to his other teammates. Taj was a late bloomer which was not from regular state President Cup or youth teams.

Club career

UITM
Amirizdwan further his study at Universiti Teknologi MARA in Sport Science. He then join UiTM football team to play for IPT League. His series of good performance caught the eye of several coach from other club and one of them was former coach of Kelantan, B. Sathianathan in a friendly between UiTM Fc and Kelantan. When B. Sathianathan appointed as ATM, he signs Amirizdwan.

Amirizdwan joined ATM at the start of the year after three seasons with UiTM and immediately tasted success after helping his side winning the Malaysia Premier League, and gain promotion to the Malaysia Super League. He also won Sultan Haji Ahmad Shah Cup in 2013 with ATM.

Amirizdwan was a complete and versatile player; he was gifted with excellent technical ability, vision and passing range. He was also a strong, tall, tenacious, influential, hardworking, and physical player. He has played much of his career as a centre defender,  but has also been used as a holding midfielder at early of his career.

He represented Malaysia in 2011 Summer Universiade alongside K. Reuben. Malaysia finished 12th in the tournament.

Amirizdwan made his international debut for Malaysia national football team in 2011 at the age of 25. He was called up to the national squad just before he made the move, but as soon as he started helping the Armed Forces dominate the Premier League in 2012, his regular inclusion in the national set-up was a no-brainer. Despite play for Harimau Malaya occasionally, he never gets a chance to play for big tournament due to injuries and being over looked by the coach.

ATM FA
In 2012, Amirizdwan joined ATM and was given squad number 24. He helped his side in winning the 2012 Malaysia Premier League, and promotion to the Malaysia Super League for 2013 season. At the start of his ATM's career, Amirizdwan usually used as a midfielder but later switch his position to central defender.

2015 season
In April, they removed B. Sathianathan from the head coach position, sparking an exodus of players. Amirizdwan finally decided to end ties with ATM and return to his home state. A fresh start, was what he was ultimately craving for.

Kelantan FA
Amirizdwan signed with Kelantan FA in April 2015, The signing was announced on the Red Warriors' social media accounts, which also added that the Kota Bharu-born former UiTM FC player would be wearing number 42 on his kit for the remainder of 2015 season. Amirizdwan has been linked with home state team for the past few years, after his rise from university-level football. He scored his first goal for Kelantan with a header against Sime Darby FC which ended 2-2 that night. At the time that the Red Warriors were undergoing a severe financial crisis Amirizdwan's departure was widely discussed.

Terengganu FA

Despite interest from other clubs, Amirizdwan signed with Terengganu FA on 2 December 2015. He will be given number 3 in the squad. A few weeks ago though, speculations of his departure became rife, with Kelantan's well-documented financial issues dominating the narrative. Amir though after signing his contract with the Turtles yesterday claims that his departure was ultimately fueled by other reasons.

Amir was released by Terengganu without making any appearance after just 6 month signed for the club. The former UiTM, ATM and Kelantan player has always grappled with long-term injuries.

PKNS FC
Amir signed for PKNS FC for 2017 season.

International career

In October 2011, he was called up by K. Rajagobal for the national team's training session for an international friendly against India.

Managerial career
On 1 February 2021, he was hired to became assistant coach for Mokhtar Dahari Academy to aid producing quality young players from the grassroots development program.

Career statistics

Club

International

Honours

Club
ATM FA
 Malaysia Premier League : 2012
 Malaysia Cup : runnner-up 2012
 Sultan Haji Ahmad Shah Cup : 2013

Kelantan FA
 Malaysia FA Cup : runnner-up 2015

Kelantan United F.C.
 Malaysia M3 League : 2019

Personal life
Amirizdwan is a Kelantan supporter. He married longtime girlfriend Anna Syahida Tamsir when they were student at UITM Shah Alam. He also an excellent student during his school days when he enrolled in Mara junior college. He also has siblings that played football professionally, amir ikhwan taj played for uitm fc, amir izham taj for felda utd u21.

Amir himself admired that he's not planned to play football professionally. He never involved in any football pyramid like others do. He didn't went to youth academy, neither sport school. But during his college years where he just play for his residential college for inter-college games, a coach spotted him and called him to be trained with UiTM Fc. That seems to be cinderella story for him when coach B.Sathianathan whom are head coach for Kelantan that season offered his to play in Malaysia Cup campaign but that deal seems impossible when rules only applicable to those who are played with super league or premier league team that failed to qualified for that competition since Uitm Fc are in FAM League.

2011 is a breakthrough year for him when he selected in national team friendly match with India. Maybe the only player from FAM league and only UiTM Fc player being able to do so.

References

External links
Official Facebook Profile
Official Twitter

1986 births
Living people
MARA Junior Science College alumni
People from Kelantan
Malaysian footballers
Malaysia international footballers
Malaysia Super League players
Association football central defenders
People from Kota Bharu
UiTM FC players
ATM FA players
Kelantan FA players
Terengganu FC players
PKNS F.C. players